Municipal elections were held in Finland on 26 October 2008, with advance voting between 15 and 21 October 2008. 10,412 municipal council seats were open for election in 332 municipalities. The number of councillors decreased by over 1,554 compared to the previous election due to the merging of several municipalities.

National results

References

Municipal elections in Finland
2008 elections in Finland
October 2008 events in Europe